N M Anik (also known as Master Anik) is a Bangladeshi film actor. He won Bangladesh National Film Award for Best Child Artist for the film Obujh Sontan (1993).

Selected films
 Abujh Sontan - 1993

Awards and nominations
National Film Awards

References

External links

Bangladeshi film actors
Best Child Artist National Film Award (Bangladesh) winners
Living people
Year of birth missing (living people)